The 1921–22 Holy Cross Crusaders men's basketball team represented The College of the Holy Cross during the 1921–22 NCAA men's basketball season. The head coach was William Casey, coaching the crusaders in his third season. The team finished with an overall record of 14–3.

Schedule

|-

References

Holy Cross Crusaders men's basketball seasons
Holy Cross